Shun On Estate is a public housing estate in Shun Lee, Kowloon, Hong Kong near On Tai Estate, Shun Lee Estate, Shun Tin Estate and Shun Lee Tsuen Sports Centre. It consists of three residential blocks completed in 1978 and 1980 respectively.

History
On 17 February 2017, a 16-year-old boy was arrested for targeting an eleven-year-old girl at Shun On Estate the previous day shortly after she got off the minibus to return home.

Houses

Demographics
According to the 2016 by-census, Shun On Estate had a population of 7,511. The median age was 50.7 and the majority of residents (98 per cent) were of Chinese ethnicity. The average household size was 2.5 people. The median monthly household income of all households (i.e. including both economically active and inactive households) was HK$20,000.

Politics
Shun On Estate is located in On Lee constituency of the Kwun Tong District Council. It was formerly represented by Choy Chak-hung, who was elected in the 2019 elections until July 2021.

See also

Shun Lee

References

Residential buildings completed in 1978
Residential buildings completed in 1980
Shun Lee
Public housing estates in Hong Kong